Mountain Shore is a private housing estate in Tai Shui Hang, Ma On Shan, Sha Tin District, New Territories, Hong Kong. The estate is one of the Hong Kong Housing Society's Sandwich Class Housing Scheme projects converted into private developments.

The housing estate is built along Tide Cove. It comprises five high-rise buildings with a total of 1,124 units. It was developed by Hong Kong Housing Society in 2002. All units were initially sold within 9 hours in April 2002 at an average price of HK$2,900 per sq. ft.

Transport
MTR
Tuen Ma line Tai Shui Hang station
Buses

Buses serving Mountain Shore
Kowloon Motor Bus
40S - Nai Chung → Kwai Chung (Kwai Fong Estate) (Morning Rush Time Service)
40X - Wu Kai Sha Station ↔ Kwai Chung Estate
43X - Tsuen Wan West Station ↔ Yiu On
81C - Yiu On ↔ Tsim Sha Tsui East (Mody Road)
85K - Heng On ↔ Sha Tin Station 
85M - Kam Ying Court ↺ Wong Tai Sin
85S - Yiu On → Hung Hom (Hung Luen Road) (Morning Rush Time Service)
85X - Ma On Shan Town Centre ↔ Hung Hom (Hung Luen Road)
86C - Ma On Shan (Lee On) ↔ Cheung Sha Wan
86K - Kam Ying Court ↔ Sha Tin Station 
86S - Kam Ying Court ↔ Sha Tin Station (Rush Time Service)
87D - Kam Ying Court ↔ Hung Hom Station
89C - Heng On ↔ Kwun Tong (Tsui Ping Road)
89D - Wu Kai Sha Station ↔ Lam Tin station
89P - Ma On Shan Town Centre → Lam Tin Station (Morning Rush Time Service)
274 - Sheung Shui (Tai Ping) → Wu Kai Sha Station (Morning Rush Time Service)
281X - Yiu On → Tsim Sha Tsui East (Mody Road) (Morning Rush Time Service)
286C - Ma On Shan (Lee On) ↔ Cheung Sha Wan (Sham Mong Road)
286M - Ma On Shan Town Centre ↺ Diamond Hill station
289K - University Station ↺ Chevalier Garden 
299X - Sai Kung ↔ Shatin Central
N281 - Hung Hom Station ↔ Kam Ying Court (Midnight Service)
N287 - Tsim Sha Tsui East (Mody Road) → Wu Kai Sha Station (Midnight Service)
Cross Harbour Tunnel Bus
680 - Lee On ↔ Admiralty (East)
680A - Lee On → Admiralty (East) (Morning Rush Time Service)
680P - Ma On Shan Town Centre → Admiralty (East) (Morning Rush Time Service)
681P - Yiu On ↔ Sheung Wan (Rush Time Service)
682 - Ma On Shan (Wu Kai Sha Station) ↔ Chai Wan (East)
682A - Ma On Shan Town Centre/Nai Chung ↔ Chai Wan (East) (Rush Time Service)
980X - Wu Kai Sha Station ↔ Wan Chai/Admiralty (East) (Rush Time Service)
981P - Yiu On ↔ Wan Chai/Admiralty (East) (Rush Time Service)
N680 - Kam Ying Court ↔ Central (Macau Ferry) (Midnight Service)
Long Win Bus
A41P - Airport (Ground Transportation Centre) ↔ Ma On Shan (Wu Kai Sha Station)
N42 - Tung Chung Station ↔ Ma On Shan (Yiu On) (Midnight Service)
NA40 - Hong Kong-Zhuhai-Macao Bridge Hong Kong Port ↔ Ma On Shan (Wu Kai Sha Station) (Midnight Service)

References 

Residential buildings completed in 2002
Tai Shui Hang
Private housing estates in Hong Kong
2002 establishments in Hong Kong